Versonnex may refer to the following places in France:

 Versonnex, Ain, a commune in the department of Ain
 Versonnex, Haute-Savoie, a commune in the department of Haute-Savoie